Mohammad Yunus (15 December 1915 – 16 November 1992) was an Indian cricket umpire. He stood in five Test matches between 1958 and 1965.

See also
 List of Test cricket umpires

References

1915 births
1992 deaths
People from Secunderabad
Indian Test cricket umpires
Cricketers from Hyderabad, India